Pedro Antonio Barroeta y Ángel ( – ) was a Spanish Catholic priest who served as Archbishop of Lima and Archbishop of Granada.  

He studied theology at Cuenca, and soon became noted for his learning. After filling several high offices at Coria and Malaga he was appointed archbishop of Lima, Peru and consecrated 25 June, 1751. He at once began to promote reforms among the clergy and in the church administration, devoting himself entirely to that purpose and to charity. Barroeta distributed all his revenues among the needy, and when transferred to the see of Granada, Spain in 1758, he was so poor that his brother had to pay the expenses of the voyage. Pedro Antonio Barroeta y Ángel died on 20 March 1775 in Granada.

  

Created via preloaddraft
Roman Catholic archbishops of Lima
Archbishops of Granada
1701 births
1775 deaths